Amalia (minor planet designation: 284 Amalia) is a large main belt asteroid. It was discovered by Auguste Charlois on 29 May 1889 in Nice. This is classified as a Ch-type asteroid in the Bus taxonomy and CX in the Tholen system. It has been observed occulting stars on five occasions as of 2018, which provide a  diameter estimate of  via a fitted ellipse plot.

References

External links
 
 

Background asteroids
Amalia
Amalia
CX-type asteroids (Tholen)
Ch-type asteroids (SMASS)
18890529
Objects observed by stellar occultation